Rooster were an English hard rock band from London. Formed in 2003, the group featured vocalist Nick Atkinson, guitarist Luke Potashnick, bassist Ben Smyth and drummer Dave Neale. Signed to Brightside Recordings, the band released their debut album Rooster in 2005. The group's second album Circles and Satellites followed in 2006, before the band broke up in 2007.

Often considered a pop rock or teen pop band in a similar vein to Busted, Rooster were more influenced by hard rock acts such as Led Zeppelin and Cream. Atkinson and Potashnick led the majority of songwriting on the first album, with Smyth and Neale contributing more to the second. Rooster was a commercial success, reaching number three on the UK Albums Chart.

History

2003–2005: Early years and debut album
After his previous band 50.Grind broke up, singer Nick Atkinson formed Rooster with childhood friend Luke Potashnick, who had attended Eastbourne College with him on guitar. The pair began writing songs together, before enlisting drummer Dave Neale (who had previously toured with Potashnick) and then bassist Ben Smyth (after advertising the role in the music press) to complete the lineup of the band in late 2003. The name Rooster was chosen based on that of a horse on which Atkinson won £250 in a bet.

Rooster signed with Hugh Goldsmith's Sony BMG sub-label Brightside Recordings and recorded their debut album with producers including Steve Robson, Pete Woodroffe and Charlie Grant. The band released their first single "Come Get Some" on 11 October 2004, which reached number 7 on the UK Singles Chart. Also in 2004, the group became the first to broadcast a live performance over the 3G mobile phone network. "Staring at the Sun" followed on 10 January 2005, which peaked at number 5 on the UK Singles Chart.

Two weeks after "Staring at the Sun", Rooster's self-titled debut album was released on 24 January 2005. The album reached number 3 on the UK Albums Chart, behind Push the Button by The Chemical Brothers and Hot Fuss by The Killers, and as of July 2006 had sold over 500,000 copies, approximately half of which were in the UK. "You're So Right for Me" and "Deep and Meaningless" were released as the final two singles from the album, reaching 14 and 29 on the UK Singles Chart, respectively. Rooster toured in promotion of the album, reportedly playing a total of over 150 shows in 2005.

2005–2007: Second album and breakup
After promotion of their self-titled debut album, Rooster recorded the follow-up with producer Matt Wallace in Los Angeles, California. The resulting album, Circles and Satellites, was originally released in Japan in June 2006, where it reached the top ten of the Oricon Albums Chart. The lead single from the album, "Home", was released in July and reached number 33 on the UK Singles Chart. Circles and Satellites was subsequently delayed, after a planned release on 24 July, eventually being released in the UK on 2 October. It reached number 192 on the chart.

The band toured extensively in promotion of the release, with regular support band GetAmped joined on each date by various local acts nominated by fans. "Good to Be Here", which was also featured on the soundtrack to the film Stormbreaker, was released as the second single from the album, but failed to chart.

In 2007, Rooster announced on their Myspace page that they had broken up. Since the group's disbandment, Atkinson has played in the band The Ya Ya Boys and written songs for artists such as Boyzone and Gabrielle Aplin, while Potashnick has joined The Temperance Movement and performed with artists including Olly Murs and One Direction.

Band members
Nick Atkinson – vocals
Luke Potashnick – guitar
Ben Smyth – bass guitar, backing vocals
Dave Neale – drums

Discography

Studio albums

Singles

Video albums

References

English indie rock groups
Musical groups established in 2003
Musical groups disestablished in 2007
2003 establishments in England